{{DISPLAYTITLE:C24H25NO3}}
The molecular formula C24H25NO3 may refer to:

 Benzylmorphine, an opioid analgesic
 Cyphenothrin, a pyrethroid insecticide
 4'-Hydroxynorendoxifen
 N-Phenethylnormorphine